Erie Railroad Station may refer to:
 Erie Railroad Station (Jamestown, New York), listed on the NRHP in New York
 Erie Railroad Station (Port Jervis, New York), known also as Erie Depot, listed on the NRHP in New York
 Erie Railroad Station (Susquehanna, Pennsylvania), listed on the NRHP in Pennsylvania